Dr. Udo Weilacher (born 1963 in Kaiserslautern) is a German landscape architect, author and Professor for Landscape Architecture.

Biography

Udo Weilacher was educated as a gardener in 1984. He studied landscape architecture at the Technical University of Munich-Weihenstephan and at the California State Polytechnic University, Pomona between 1986 and 1993. At the Technical University of Munich he received his diploma from the German landscape architect and professor Peter Latz. At the University of Karlsruhe and the ETH Zürich where he worked as a scientific assistant and a lecturer until 2002, it was the renowned Swiss landscape architect Dieter Kienast, who influenced Weilacher in his practical and theoretical work. Since 1995, Weilacher is an officially registered Garden- and Landscape Architect at the Chamber of Architecture in Germany.

Weilacher did extensive research on the relationship between art and landscape and on theory and history of contemporary landscape architecture. He published his works internationally, is a member in international juries and initiated numerous projects fusing art and landscape architecture, among others with the "Zeichen + Landschaft" association at the Technical University of Munich and the "Grenzland" lecture series at the Swiss Federal Institute of Technology ETH Zürich.

After teaching and research work at the University of Karlsruhe (TH) and the ETH Zurich, where he gained his distinguished doctorate in 2002  (Medal of the ETH Zürich), he became full professor for Landscape Architecture and Design  at the Leibniz University Hannover in 2002 and, in 2006-08, Dean of the Faculty of Architecture and Landscape Sciences.

From 1998 to 2002 he worked as freelance journalist for NZZ FOLIO, monthly magazine of the Neue Zürcher Zeitung. Since April 2009 Udo Weilacher is full professor for Landscape Architecture and Industrial Landscapes at the Technische Universität München, Faculty of Architecture.

Academic Memberships 
Udo Weilacher is or was a member in national and international scientific and professional organisations:
 BDLA, German Association of Landscape Architects
 DGGL, German Society of Garden Architecture and Landscape Culture 
 CGL, Centre of Garden Art and Landscape Architecture at the Leibniz University Hannover
 Deutscher Werkbund, German Association of Craftsmen
 International Doctoral College "Spatial Research Lab"

Honors and awards
 1990 Special Recognition by the California State Polytechnic University, Pomona for excellent program achievement
 1995 Peter Joseph Lenné-Award in Germany for outstanding landscape design project
 1995 Schinkel-Award in Germany for outstanding landscape design project
 2001 Medal of the ETH Zurich for outstanding dissertation
 2011 John Brinckerhoff Jackson Book Prize by the Foundation of Landscape Studies in New York for the book Syntax of Landscape. The Landscape Architecture by Peter Latz und Partners
 2017 Mellon Practitioner Resident at Dumbarton Oaks Research Library and Collection, Washington, D.C.

Publications (selection)
 List of publications at the Technical University of Munich 
 Articles by Udo Weilacher at the NZZ Folio  
 Weilacher, Udo (1996/1999): Between Landscape Architecture and Land Art. Basel Berlin Boston: Birkhauser; 
 Weilacher, Udo/ Wullschleger, Peter (2002): Guide to Swiss Landscape Architecture. Basel Berlin Boston: Birkhauser Publisher
 Weilacher, Udo (2005): Visionary Gardens. Modern Landscapes by Ernst Cramer. Basel Berlin Boston: Birkhauser; 
 Weilacher, Udo (2005): In Gardens. Profiles of contemporary European Landscape Architecture. Basel Berlin Boston: Birkhauser; 
 Weilacher, Udo (2006): Promises instead of ready-made answers. in: Quart Verlag, Luzern (ed.): Schweingruber Zulauf. Volume 3 of the Series Arcadia 2006. 8-49. Luzern: Quart Verlag; 
 Weilacher, Udo (2006): Image Worlds in Motion. Landscapes Accelerated and De-accelerated" in: Franzen, Brigitte/Krebs, Stefanie (ed.): Mikrolandschaften. Landscape Culture on the Move. Microlandscapes. 184-199 Koeln: Buchhandlung Walther Koenig; 
Udo Weilacher: Switzerland und approximately 18 other contributions in: Taylor, Patrick (ed.): The Oxford Companion to the Garden. Oxford University Press, New York 2006; 
 Bettina von Dziembowski, Dominik von König, Udo Weilacher (2007): NEULAND. Bildende Kunst und Landschaftsarchitektur. Basel Berlin Boston: Birkhauser; 
Udo Weilacher (2007): The Garden as the Last Luxury Today: Thought-Provoking Garden Projects by Dieter Kienast. in: Conan, Michel (ed.): Contemporary Garden Aesthetics, Creations and Interpretations. 81-95. Harvard University Press 
Udo Weilacher (2007): Land Art in: Colafranceschi, Daniela (ed.): Landscape + 100 words to inhabit it. Land&ScapeSeries. 108-110. Barcelona: Editorial Gustavo Gili SL.
 Weilacher, Udo (2008): Syntax of Landscape. The Landscape Architecture by Peter Latz and Partners.'' Basel Berlin Boston: Birkhauser;

References

External links

 Landscape Architecture at the Technical University of Munich
  List of publications by Udo Weilacher at mediaTUM, the digital mediaserver at the TU München
 ORCID profile of Udo Weilacher
 ResearchGate profile of Udo Weilacher
 

1963 births
Living people
German landscape architects
Technical University of Munich alumni
Academic staff of the Technical University of Munich